The Brantevik Eel (Before 1859 - Before 7 August 2014), also known as Åle, was a European eel (Anguilla anguilla) that is believed to have lived for more than 150 years.

The eel was released into a well in the town of Brantevik, Sweden in 1859 by an eight-year-old boy, Samuel Nilsson. On 7 August 2014, the eel was reported to have died and was sent to an expert to determine the eel's actual age.

The eel's head, presumed lost, was recovered later in a fridge. SVT's nature show Mitt i naturen extracted the eel from the well at one point, but put it back.

References 

Eels
Fauna of Sweden
Individual fish